Air Guyane SP is a French airline with its head office on the grounds of Cayenne-Rochambeau Airport in Matoury, French Guiana, France. It operates regional scheduled flights. Its main base is Cayenne-Rochambeau Airport.

History 

On 1 June 2002 Air Guyane Express took over the operations of the former Air Guyane.
It also operates in the French Antilles with 2 ATR 42 aircraft on routes between Fort-de-France, Pointe-à-Pitre, Saint Martin and Sainte Lucie under the name of Air Antilles Express.

Destinations 
As of August 2010, Air Guyane Express operates scheduled passenger flights to the following destinations:

Brazil
Macapa - Macapa International Airport 
French Guiana
Cayenne - Cayenne-Rochambeau Airport (Hub)
Grand Santi - Grand Santi Airport
Maripasoula - Maripasoula Airport
Saint-Laurent du Maroni - Saint-Laurent du Maroni Airport
Saül - Saül Airport
Guadeloupe
Pointe-à-Pitre - Le Raizet Airport
Martinique
Fort-de-France - Le Lamentin Airport
Saint Martin
Grand Case - L'Espérance Airport

Fleet 
The Air Guyane fleet consists of the following aircraft (as of April 2019).:

The Air Guyane fleet included the following aircraft in April 2008:

1 ATR 42-300 (which is leased to Air Antilles Express)
3 ATR 42-500 (which 2 are leased to Air Antilles Express)
1 Britten-Norman BN2A Islander
3 De Havilland Canada DHC-6 Twin Otter Series 300
1 Reims-Cessna F406 Caravan II

External links

Air Guyane Express 
Air Guyane Express Fleet

References

Airlines of French Guiana
Airlines established in 2002
2002 establishments in French Guiana
Airlines of France
Buildings and structures in Matoury